Einstein is an underground metro station on the Line 2 of the Santiago Metro, in Santiago, Chile. This station is named for Einstein Avenue, which in turn was named after Albert Einstein. The station was opened on 25 November 2005 as the northern terminus of the extension of the line from Cerro Blanco. On 21 December 2006, the line was extended to Vespucio Norte.

References

Santiago Metro stations
Railway stations opened in 2005
Santiago Metro Line 2